Mortimer William Landsberg Jr. (July 25, 1919 – December 31, 1970) was an American football halfback. He was Jewish.

He played for the Philadelphia Eagles in 1941, and for the Los Angeles Dons in 1947.

References

1919 births
1970 deaths
American football halfbacks
Cornell Big Red football players
Philadelphia Eagles players
Los Angeles Dons players
Jewish American sportspeople
20th-century American Jews